The 2013 Campeonato Ecuatoriano de Fútbol de la Serie A (officially known as the Copa Pilsener Serie A for sponsorship reasons) was the 55th season of the Serie A, Ecuador's premier football league. Barcelona was the defending champion.

Format
On the night of January 8, 2013, the Ecuadorian Football Federation determined that the format for 2013 would be the same as the previous season.

Teams
Twelve teams will compete in the 2013 Serie A season, ten of whom remain from the previous season. Técnico Universitario and Olmedo were relegated last season after accumulating the fewest points in the 2012 season aggregate table. They will be replaced by Universidad Católica and Deportivo Quevedo, the 2012 Serie B winner and runner-up, respectively. Both teams are making returns to the Serie A. Universidad Católica is returning after two seasons, while Deportivo Quevedo is returning after seven.

Managerial changes

First stage
The first stage began on January 25 and ended on June 30.

Standings

Results

Second stage
The second stage began on July 5 and will end on December 8.

Standings

Results

Aggregate table

Third stage
The Third Stage was not played as Emelec won both the first stage and second stage, and were crowned champions automatically. They earned the Ecuador 1 berth in the 2014 Copa Libertadores and the Ecuador 1 berth in the 2014 Copa Sudamericana.

Top goalscorers

Updated as of games played on December 8, 2013.Source:

Hat tricks

4 Player scored 4 goals.

References

External links
Official website 

Ecuadorian Serie A seasons
Ecuatoriano De Futbol Serie A
Serie A